Theobald IV may refer to:
 Theobald IV of Blois (1090–1152)
 Theobald IV of Champagne (1201–1253)